Jeungmi Station is a railway station on Line 9 of the Seoul Subway.

Station layout

Railway stations opened in 2009
Seoul Metropolitan Subway stations
Metro stations in Gangseo District, Seoul